"Talking Loud and Clear" is a song by English electronic band Orchestral Manoeuvres in the Dark (OMD), released on 4 June 1984 as the second single from their fifth studio album Junk Culture (1984). The single was a European hit, reaching the Top 10 in Ireland, Belgium and the Netherlands, and No. 11 in the UK. It also charted at No. 18 in Germany. The song was edited for its 7" single release.

A 12" extended version was also issued. The remix is effectively divided into two parts starting with a solely instrumental section followed by a section featuring vocals and instrumentation, the whole piece lasting over eight minutes. The extended version featured on the deluxe remastered release of Junk Culture in 2015 features the second part only. The full extended recording is featured on So80s presents Orchestral Manoeuvres in the Dark released in 2011.

The 7" version of "Talking Loud and Clear" is featured on all OMD singles and greatest hits compilations.

Simon Milne filmed the official music video.

Critical reception
Brian Chin of Billboard referred to "Talking Loud and Clear" as a "very attractive pop song". As a guest singles reviewer in Smash Hits, Duran Duran bassist John Taylor described the track as "very charming" and a "good record". In a retrospective appraisal, Dave Thompson of AllMusic observed a "lovely" single with "deftly penned" lyrics.

B-side
The B-side, "Julia's Song", is a radically different version from the same song recorded for the group's debut studio album Orchestral Manoeuvres in the Dark in 1980. This is a reworked version with newly recorded vocals, a slower tempo and brass added by the Weir Brothers more in line with the style of other tracks on Junk Culture. An extended version was issued for the 12" release and like the extended version of "Talking Loud and Clear" is divided into two parts. The second part features on the bonus disc of the deluxe remastered version of Junk Culture in 2015. The first part was issued as a 10" single for Record Store Day in 2015 under the title "Julia's Song (Dub Version)".

Track listing
7" and 7" picture disc
 "Talking Loud and Clear" – 3:53
 "Julia's Song" – 4:17

12"
 "Talking Loud and Clear" (extended version) – 8:50
 "Julia's Song" (extended version) – 8:33

Charts

Weekly charts

Year-end charts

Live recordings
A live performance of "Talking Loud and Clear" recorded at Solihull NEC in December 1993 was issued on the limited edition CD single of "Universal" in 1996. The song was also part of the concert performed with the Royal Liverpool Philharmonic Orchestra on 20 June 2009 at the Philharmonic Hall in Liverpool as documented by the Electricity DVD (2009).

References

External links
 

1984 singles
Orchestral Manoeuvres in the Dark songs
Songs written by Andy McCluskey
Songs written by Paul Humphreys
1984 songs
Virgin Records singles